Depoke is a village in the Narowal District of Punjab province of Pakistan. It is located at 32°16'0N 74°50'0E with an altitude of 246 metres (810 feet). Neighbouring settlements include Lala, Seowal and Lohan.

References

Villages in Narowal District